Istanbul Medipol University is a private university in Istanbul, Turkey. It was founded by Turkey Education Health and Research Foundation in 2009. The founder of the foundation is Fahrettin Koca, who is the current Minister of Health of Turkey.

The university consists of 12 faculties, 5 institutes and 4 vocational colleges. There are 37.051 registered students studying at the university. The number of undergraduate students is 22.526 and the number of graduate students is 1.766. The number of associate degree students is 12.759. And the foreign students number is 2.854. Some 1.213 academicians lecture at the university and 2.309 administrative personnel work at the university.

The university has 71 undergraduate programs in 13 faculties. Twenty-four of these programs are taught in English.

History 
Istanbul Medipol University was established on 7 July 2009 by the Medipolitan Education and Health Foundation (today's Turkey Education Health and Research Foundation) and gained its public legal personality as a foundation university. University continues its educational activities in Haliç and Kavacık Campuses. In addition, students' practice courses and internship trainings are held at Medipol University Hospital.

Istanbul Medipol University Faculty of Law became a member of the European Law Faculties Association in 2015, where law faculties in Europe come together under various activities.

Academic units

Faculties 

 Faculty of Dentistry
 Faculty of Pharmacy
 Faculty of Fine Arts, Design and Architecture
 Faculty of Education
 Faculty of Law
 Faculty of Business and Management Sciences
 Faculty of Humanities and Social Sciences
 Faculty of Engineering and Natural Sciences
 Faculty of Communication
 Faculty of Health Sciences
 Faculty of Medicine
 International Faculty of Medicine

Graduate schools 

 Graduate School of Forensic Sciences
 Graduate School of Engineering and Natural Sciences
 Graduate School of Health Sciences
 Graduate School of Social Sciences

See also
 List of universities in Turkey

References

External links
 Istanbul Medipol University homepage
 Istanbul Medipol University library
 Medipol Health Group

Istanbul Medipol University
Universities and colleges in Istanbul
Private universities and colleges in Turkey
Educational institutions established in 2009
2009 establishments in Turkey
Universities and colleges in Turkey